Matai Rangi Smith (born 2 May 1977) is a New Zealand television presenter.

Personal life
Matai was born and raised in Gisborne, New Zealand and later moved to Auckland when he began working in Television. He speaks fluent Te Reo Maori and is of Rongowhakaata, Ngāi Tāmanuhiri  and Ngāti Kahungunu descent.

In April 2013, Matai announced his same-sex relationship with The GC star, Alby Waititi. The announcement was made before the final reading of the controversial Marriage (Definition of Marriage) Amendment Bill.

Career
Matai was first seen as a host on children's show Pukana, an educational/variety show written entirely in Māori. He is better known as host of Korero Mai and Whanau, a drama series that teaches the Maori language to viewers. Matai has since hosted live karaoke show Homai Te Paki Paki, as well as appearing as a regular host on Good Morning between 2007 and 2012. He is one of very few personalities who has worked for most of New Zealand's main national television networks, including Māori Television, TVNZ and TV3.

Awards
In 2005, 2006 and 2007 Matai won Best Te Reo Māori Television Presenter (Male) at the Māori Media Awards. Then in 2012, he won Best Presenter in the entertainment/factual category at the 2012 New Zealand Television Awards for his work on Homai Te Paki Paki.

References

External links
 TVNZ - Personality Profile

1977 births
Living people
People from Gisborne, New Zealand
New Zealand television presenters
Ngāti Kahungunu people
Rongowhakaata people
New Zealand Māori broadcasters